This is the complete list of number-one albums in Finland in 2017 according to the Official Finnish Charts compiled by Musiikkituottajat – IFPI Finland. The chart is based on sales of physical and digital albums as well as music streaming.

Chart history

See also
List of number-one singles of 2017 (Finland)

References

Number-one albums
Finland Albums
2017